SPIJØNGET  is the debut studio album by South African rapper, producer and graphic designer ByLwansta. The album consists of a series of three 4-track EPs, ultimately making up the 12-track studio album.

Background
Three years since the release of his Your Absolutely Right EP, ByLwansta went on an involuntary hiatus from releasing music, citing external pressures and anxiety as reasons that lead him to overthink his writing process, leaving him unable to write and release any new music. As a result, ByLwansta would shift his focus from writing to producing in 2018, and he would spend his breaks from freelance design creating beats and experimenting using FL Studio.

Chapter one
In February 2018, ByLwansta met bassist Giyani Shangase at a show in Durban. Curious about when ByLwansta was planning on playing live with a band, he suggested that they get together in the week for a rehearsal with 2 other musicians, Jaedon Daniel and Byron Thambu, thus forming the band NORMVLLY Busy. ByLwansta hosted a show in Cape Town with the band, as part of his NORMVL Agenda concert series, his first performance in the city. During their last rehearsal before the show, ByLwansta and Jaedon began to freestyle a melody and a chorus that would become a song called "STAY NAKED", which they would immediately perform at the show hours later. The following day, the band created and recorded the song at the Red Bull Studios.

Returning to some unfinished beats on his FL Studio, ByLwansta began to work towards completing Chapter One of The SPIJØNGET Series. Chapter One was released independently in March 2019, following his move to Johannesburg earlier in the year. "KICKSTAND", the EP's third track featuring PATFROMTHESLUMS, was released with French electronic music label, Kitsune Musique as a single. This would become ByLwansta's second opportunity for exposure to the European music scene after his appearance on COLORS in 2017.

Chapter two
ByLwansta would spend the rest of 2019 touring the project in Europe and in the United States. He would unofficially begin working on Chapter Two in August, where he met German electronic music producer Robot Koch to create music commissioned by Pop-Kultur Festival. He would officially begin working on Chapter Two in October, after having "lived Chapter Two first before writing about it - and reflecting on it in the music".

ByLwansta announced that he was done recording for Chapter Two on the 18th of December via his Instagram, and soon began to roll out some of the project's visuals, namely a picture of two African Lilies on a black background, following it with various photos of gardens and bushes of the African Lily. He eventually revealed the EP's cover art on the 24th of January. A week later he revealed the first single would be his collaboration with Robot Koch, on a song titled "THE BIKE SONG".

Title and concept
The title is a term coined ByLwansta, an acronym for Stop Postponing Ideas & Joylessly Øverthinking Newly-Generated Expressions & Thoughts, it's synonymous with "fuck it, just do it".

Inspired by his creative block and his inability to get past his overthinking, the term appeared in his mind as a response to a question he was asked by his then girlfriend about an episode of The Legend of Korra they were watching together, responding simply with "SPIJØNGET".

ByLwansta would go on to apply this new found rationale to his music, returning to four of the most complete song ideas that he had initially dismissed, hoping to finally part with them as what he would ultimately dub as phase one or chapter one of the SPIJØNGET.

Tracklisting

Notes:

 "STAY NAKED" features additional vocals from Sanele Balintaba

Sample Credits:

 "STAY NAKED" contains a dialogue from Episode 9: "My Two Favorite People" from Adventure Time

References

2019 debut albums
Hip hop albums by South African artists